Teonaht  is a constructed language that has been developed since 1962 by science fiction writer and University of Rochester English professor Sarah Higley, under the pseudonym of Sally Caves. It is spoken in the fantasy setting of the Teonim, a race of polydactyl humans who have a cultural history of worshiping catlike deities.

Teonaht uses the object–subject–verb (OSV) word order, which is rare in natural languages. An interesting feature of Teonaht is that the end of the sentence is the place of greatest emphasis, as what is mentioned last is uppermost in the mind. The language has a "Law of Detachment" whereby suffixes can be moved to the beginnings of words for emphasis and even attach onto other words such as pronouns.

Teonaht is often cited as an example of the genre in articles on the world of Internet-hosted amateur conlanging.

In May 2019, the Washington Post shared audio of Caves singing in Teonaht.

Notes

References
NPR interview with Sally Caves

External links 
Sally Caves's Teonaht page

Artistic languages
Constructed languages introduced in 1962
Constructed languages